Farzin Garousian; is an Iranian footballer who last played as a goalkeeper for Sanat Naft Abadan.

He was released by Tractor in June 2018.

References 

1992 births
Living people
Iranian footballers
Esteghlal F.C. players
Association football goalkeepers
Esteghlal Khuzestan F.C. players
People from Tonekabon
Sportspeople from Mazandaran province
20th-century Iranian people
21st-century Iranian people